In mathematics, the Hellinger integral is an  integral introduced by  that is a special case of the Kolmogorov integral. It is used to define the Hellinger distance in probability theory.

References

Definitions of mathematical integration